The Life of Mammals is a nature documentary series written and presented by David Attenborough, first transmitted in the United Kingdom from 20 November 2002.

A study of the evolution and habits of the various mammal species, it was the fourth of Attenborough's specialised surveys following his major trilogy that began with Life on Earth. Each of the ten episodes looks at one (or several closely related) mammal groups and discusses the different facets of their day-to-day existence and their evolutionary origins. All the programmes are of 50 minutes' duration except the last, which extends to 59 minutes.

The series was produced by the BBC Natural History Unit in conjunction with the Discovery Channel. The executive producer was Mike Salisbury and the music was composed by Dan Jones and Ben Salisbury. It was later shown on Animal Planet.

Part of David Attenborough's Life series, it was preceded by The Life of Birds (1998), and followed by Life in the Undergrowth (2005). However, in between the former and this series, David Attenborough presented State of the Planet (2000) and narrated The Blue Planet (2001).

Background 
The mammals are such a widespread, varied and successful group of animals that Attenborough had previously devoted no fewer than five episodes of Life on Earth to them. Nevertheless, there was much that remained untold and behaviour that was not hitherto filmed. The Life of Mammals was intended to be his definitive account of the subject.

Attenborough took on the series at the suggestion of the BBC Natural History Unit. The naturalist's wife, Jane, had died in 1997, midway through the making of The Life of Birds, which had caused its postponement. However, Attenborough had been grateful for the fact that there was still work to be done to ensure its completion. Similarly, he was glad of another opportunity to keep himself occupied:
"The Life of Birds was transmitted in the autumn of 1998, and was sufficiently well received for the Unit to ask me if I would like to tackle another similar series about another group of animals. How about mammals? I was in my mid-seventies but I decided I would rather do that than sit at home by myself."

Production 
Despite his age, Attenborough travelled just as extensively as in all his previous productions, with each episode leapfrogging to a multitude of locations around the world.

The filming, as ever, provided many challenges. To capture footage for the first time of skunks foraging in a cave of bats, extra protective measures had to be taken for the crew, as it was a very hostile environment. The air was full of ammonia, the main occupants urinated copiously from above, and other inhabitants included flesh-eating maggots and a rattlesnake.

For a sequence featuring grizzly bears at close quarters, the camera team were accompanied by Buck Wilde, an ursine specialist. When a bear was too inquisitive he was able to command it to turn away simply by raising his hands. However, a cameraman confessed that at the time, he was sure there would come a moment when the animal would just continue towards them regardless.

To get themselves up into the canopy of a tropical rainforest the crew used a catapult to fire a fishing line 100 metres into the uppermost branches. This was then attached to a rope and pulley counterbalance system. The difficulties involved were first actually finding an ideal tree, and then, having settled on one, watching out for passing snakes and primates en route to the top.

Big cats that hunt nocturnally, such as lions, leopards and tigers, had never been extensively filmed doing so before. But the latest infrared technology revealed behaviour that had previously been guessed at from evidence discovered the next day.

The series was among the first to benefit from the features of digital television. After each episode's transmission on BBC One, terrestrial viewers were shown a ten-minute featurette on an aspect of its making. Those with digital equipment had the option of switching to an interactive quiz, hosted by Attenborough.

Themes 
In his previous natural history series, Attenborough had been reticent about describing man's impact on the natural environment (unless it was relevant to the content, as in the last episode of The Living Planet or The First Eden). However, since State of the Planet, the presenter had become more publicly outspoken on the subject. In the final programme of this series, "Food for Thought", he took the opportunity to put the case explicitly for finding ways to deal with overpopulation.

Episodes

DVD and book 
The series is available in the UK for Regions 2 and 4 as a 4-disc DVD (BBCDVD1128, released 7 April 2003) and as part of The Life Collection. Its special features include six "behind the scenes" featurettes, fact files, a photo gallery, the original score and a special 10-minute video-to-music montage.

The accompanying book, The Life of Mammals by David Attenborough, was published by BBC Books on 17 October 2002.

Both DVD and book have been translated to other languages.

The Dutch version of the DVD produced by Evangelische Omroep removed all references to (amongst others) evolution, fossils, and continental drift. The narration by David Attenborough has been replaced by a not always accurate Dutch translation, and cuts were made to the episodes. The tenth episode was not broadcast at all on Evangelische Omroep, and is not included on the EO DVD of the series. The Dutch version of the book includes the full text of the original book, as did the Dutch language version of the programme broadcast on the Belgian broadcaster Canvas.

References

External links 
 
 The Life of Mammals on the Eden website
 

2002 British television series debuts
2003 British television series endings
BBC television documentaries
Discovery Channel original programming
Documentary films about nature